() is the Arabic translation of the Hebrew title  ('Messiah') or the Greek title  ('Christ'), meaning "the anointed one". It is the common word used by Arab Christians for 'Christ', a usage which was adopted by both Christians and Muslims in a number of languages influenced by Arabic.

It also occurs eleven times in the Quran as a title for Jesus (ʿĪsā), both followed by his proper name as "the Messiah/Christ Jesus the Son of Mary" (three times) or "the Messiah/Christ the Son of Mary" (five times) and independently as "the Messiah/Christ" (three times). The title was interpreted in many different ways by Muslim exegetes, all of which tended to downplay the connection of the word to Jesus' central role in Christianity as the savior-God.

Historical background 

It was a common practice in the ancient Near East to confer kingship to new rulers by anointing them, rather than by crowning them. It is in this context that the Hebrew term  (Messiah, meaning "anointed") was originally used, referring to an eschatological figure who was expected to rise from the royal line of David and who would rule like a divine king, being God's 'anointed one'.

In the Quran 

In the Quran, however, the original meaning of the word  as "anointed" seems to play no role of significance, and the term appears to have simply become a title commonly affixed to Jesus' name, not unlike the usage of the word 'Christ' in English.

Many interpretations of the word existed. The Arabic lexicographer Fairuzabadi (1329–1414) listed no less than 49 different meanings for the title  as elaborated by Quranic exegetes. Most exegetes understood the word to be equivalent to the passive participle of the root m-s-ḥ, meaning 'wiped', 'touched', 'anointed'. Interpretations based on this derivation included that Jesus had been 'touched' by the wing of the archangel Gabriel at birth in order to safeguard him from Satan, that he had been 'anointed' with oil (as all the prophets in Islamic tradition), or that he had been 'anointed' with the blessing of God. 

Other interpretations took the word to be an active form of the root  m-s-ḥ, meaning 'wiping', 'touching', etc. This interpretation was often connected to the idea of Jesus as healing the sick by 'touching' them, or because he purified believers by 'wiping' away their sins. This latter interpretation, which among others was given by the Ismaili jurist al-Qāḍī al-Nu‘mān (died 974), was often criticized because it violates the principle found throughout the Quran that every believer is responsible for their own virtues and sins, and that only God can forgive sin.

Finally, some interpreters of the Quran took the word  to be derived not from the root m-s-ḥ, but rather from the root s-y-ḥ, meaning 'to travel', believing Jesus to have received this title because of his itinerant lifestyle.

See also 

 Christ (title)
 Christianity in the Middle East
 Islamic messianism
 Jesus
 Jesus in Islam
 Mahdi, another eschatological messianic figure in Islam
 Messiah in Islam

References

Works cited 
 
 
 

Religious titles
Christianity and Islam
Christology